Getachew Reda (Tigrinya and Amharic: ጌታቸው ረዳ; born June 1974) is an Ethiopian politician who is currently an advisor to the president of the Tigray Region, Debretsion Gebremichael.

Getachew is also an executive committee member and the spokesperson for the Tigray People's Liberation Front.

Getachew was the Minister of Government Communications Affairs in Prime Minister Hailemariam Desalegn's federal government of Ethiopia until 2016.

Early life and education
Getachew completed his undergraduate studies at Addis Ababa University's School of Law. Between 2001 and 2002, he completed a Master of Law at Alabama University, Tuscaloosa, United States. Before taking a government position in 2009, he served as a professor of law at Mekelle University, located in the capital city of Tigray Region.

Tigray War
Getachew worked as the political advisor of the President of the Tigray Region, Debretsion Gebremichael, in supporting the Tigray Defense Forces (TDF) in their war with the federal government of Ethiopia, Amhara Special Forces, Fano militia and the foreign government of Eritrea. Getachew, in an interview with Tigray TV, urged young people and others in the region to "rise and deploy to battle in tens of thousands." In April 2021, Getachew's Twitter account was verified.

On 28 June 2021, Getachew announced that the TDF had captured Mekelle, causing the ENDF soldiers to retreat entirely from the area. The Ethiopian federal government declared a unilateral ceasefire starting from 28 June 2021 until the farming season ends. On 20 December 2021, Getachew announced that the TDF had withdrawn from both Amhara and Afar regions in an attempt to induce the international community to put pressure on the Ethiopian and Eritrean governments and to facilitate the distribution of humanitarian aid in the two conflict regions. However Billene Seyoum, the spokesman for Abiy Ahmed, disputed this claim and asserted that the announcement was a cover-up for military setbacks.

On 2 November 2022, Getachew was the Tigray representative present for the signing of the agreement to permanently cease hostilities with the Ethiopian central government.

References

External links

Ethiopian People's Revolutionary Democratic Front politicians
Living people
Place of birth missing (living people)
1974 births
Tigray People's Liberation Front politicians
Addis Ababa University alumni
University of Alabama alumni